Ýewgeniý Zemskow (born 17 March 1982) is a Turkmenistani football striker who played for Turkmenistan in the 2004 AFC Asian Cup.

Zemskow played for Uzbek League side Lokomotiv Tashkent during the 2007 and 2008 seasons. He has also played for Nisa Asgabat.

References

External links

Football Database Profile

1982 births
Living people
Turkmenistan footballers
Turkmenistan international footballers
2004 AFC Asian Cup players
Association football forwards
PFC Lokomotiv Tashkent players
Turkmenistan people of Russian descent